Hagen is an American legal drama television series that aired from March 15 until April 24, 1980.

Premise
An outdoorsman works for a defense lawyer in San Francisco.

Cast
Chad Everett as Paul Hagen
Arthur Hill as Carl Palmer
Aldine King as Jody
Carmen Zapata as Mrs. Chavez

Episodes

References

External links

1980 American television series debuts
1980 American television series endings
1980s American legal television series
English-language television shows
CBS original programming
Television shows set in San Francisco
Television series by 20th Century Fox Television